The Oregon State Leather Contest (Formerly known as "Blackout Leather Productions") is the largest leather title contest in Oregon. Starting in 1997 the contest has celebrated members of the BDSM and Leather community and beginning in 2015 the Pup community. In 2019 a Mx title was added and the Puppy title was changed to Oregon State Pet. The 501c3 "Oregon State Leather Contest (Formerly:Blackout Leather Productions) has run the event which draws contestants from all over Oregon and SW Washington. Judges for the contest include local community leaders, former title holders, and international title holders. In 2021 the organization's board of directors voted to change the name of the organization from Blackout Leather Productions to Oregon State Leather Contest. 

Several winners of Oregon titles have gone on to win international titles such as the International Mister Bootblack title  and American Leatherwoman. Title holders have gone on to compete at International Ms. Leather and Bootblack, International Mr. Leather and Bootblack, and International Puppy and Handler.

Oregon State Leather Contest Board of Directors
The Oregon State Leather Contest is a nonprofit 501c3 organization that is overseen by a Board of Directors that produces the contests, and organizes  fundraising and charitable giving.

The Board of Directors currently: 

Stormy Styles, President (Former Ms. OSL 2013) (serving since 2022)
 Ivarr Brokksson, Secretary (serving since 2022)
 Nick Lette, Treasurer. (Former Mr.OSL 2018) (serving since 2020)
Ree D. - Member at large (serving since 2022)

Title Holders

Mr. Oregon State Leather
 2019-2021- Ivarr Brockson
 2018  - Papa Bear Nick Lette
 2017 - Connor Braddock
 2016 - Lucky Rebel (Went on to win IMBB 2018)
 2015 - Cole Miner
 2014 - Mister Sir Steven
 2013 - Bill Westervelt
 2012 - Danny Cage
 2011 - Tarsus
 2010 - Peter Pinn Palermo
 2009 - Brent Seeley
 2008 - Dominic
 2007 - Ben Brown Jr.
 2006 - Tom Ayers
 2005 - Jeff Landis
 2004 - Andy Mangels
 2003 - Earl Coffman
 2002 - Mack McCall
 2001 - Rob Hathaway
 2000 - Charlie Salt
 1999 - Craig W.
 1998 - Don Hood
 1997 - Thom Butts

Ms. Oregon State Leather
 2019-2021- MizTee
 2018 - Leland Carina 
 2017 - Jena Jackson
 2016 - Vacant
 2015 - Petal
 2014 - Shawna Clausen 
 2013 - Ms. Stormy
 2012 - Michelle Harris
 2011 - Mz. Tracey
 2010 - Shell Bishop
 2009 - Vacant 
 2008 - Val Vittitow
 2007 - Coral Mallow
 2006 - Tommie
 2005 - Lynnda Hale
 2004 - Theresa
 2003 - Alycyn Britton
 2002 - Daemon
 2001 - Tobin Britton
 2000 - Cyd Athens
 1999 - Vacant
 1998 - Vacant
 1997 - Lynne Pierce

Oregon State Bootblack
 2019-2021-Vacant
 2018- Sean Rebel 
 2017 - Jax Black
 2016 - Eric Windham
 2015 - Micky Rebel
 2014 - Vacant
 2013 - Dara (IMsBB 2014)
 2012 - Sammy (IMBB 2013)
 2011 - Nick Elliott (an original member of  PDX Bootblacks and IMBB 2012))

Three Oregon State Bootblacks have gone on to win International Bootblack Titles, with one placing as the 1st Runner Up.

Oregon State Pup/Pet
 2019-2021 - Pup Timber
 2018 - (requested to be removed)
 2017 - Cedar Pup
 2016 - vacant
 2015 - Pup Zombie
Pup Blaze held the Pup title in a contest that was subsequently donated to the Oregon State Contest by its founder
The title was changed from OS Pup to OS Pet in 2019, starting with Pup Timber.

References

1997 establishments in Oregon
Annual events in Oregon
Leather events